Vilhjálmsdóttir is a surname of Icelandic origin, meaning daughter of Vilhjálmur (William or Wilhelm). In Icelandic names, the name is not strictly a surname, but a patronymic. The name refers to:
Linda Vilhjálmsdóttir (b. 1958), Icelandic poet and playwright
Margrét Vilhjálmsdóttir (b. 1966), Icelandic stage, film, and television actress
Unnur Birna Vilhjálmsdóttir (b. 1984), Icelandic beauty queen; Miss World 2005

See also
Vilhjálmsson